The Exotic Tropical Flora Park Also Exotic Tropical Flora Park and Our lady of Carmel Mission Is the name given to a complex formed by an old Catholic mission transformed into a museum, a Catholic chapel and a  botanical garden with more than 2,500 varieties of plants from Colombia, Ecuador, Brazil, Panama, Nicaragua, Madagascar, Costa Rica, Thailand, Singapore, China and Australia, mainly heliconias, gingers, bromeliads and orchids arranged in a journey of 4.5 kilometers located in the valley of the Yaracuy River, in the homonymous state of Venezuela.

The tour of the park is led by an expert who usually explains the origin of each species of the walk or can also acquire a book with all the specifications and go taking their own notes while walking the route. The guides of the park also direct the option of practicing canopy walking, a discipline that consists of "walking" through the trees through a safe mechanism of harnesses and pulleys.

The fauna is as rich as the vegetation. The walk around the park is usually accompanied by araguatos (howler monkeys), butterflies, sloths, ducks, chigüires (capybara) and a great diversity of birds.

Gallery

See also
Caracas Botanical Garden
Botanical Garden of Mérida

References

Botanical gardens in Venezuela
Protected areas established in 1996
Zoos in Venezuela
Parks in Venezuela